Rotiyaan ki eid or Rottela Panduga is an annual three-day urs(festival) held at Bara Shaheed Dargah in Nellore in Andhra Pradesh, India. Annual event is observed in the month of Muharram as urs of 12 martyrs whose mortal remains are buried in the compound. Women who visit the shrine, exchange their rotis(flat breads) in Nellore Tank.

See also
Bara Shaheed Dargah

References

External links

Urs
Festivals in Andhra Pradesh
Nellore district